Let 'Em Burn is the third studio album by New Orleans rap group the Hot Boys, released March 25, 2003, on Cash Money Records. The album was originally recorded from 1998 to 2000, but was not released until three years later due to Juvenile, B.G. and Turk leaving Cash Money Records. All the production on the album is done by former Cash Money Records producer Mannie Fresh. Let 'Em Burn debuted at #14 on the Billboard 200, selling 64,000 copies in its first week. Planning for the album dates back to 1999 as promotional advertising were shown in the booklet for Lil Wayne's Tha Block Is Hot.

Track listing 

All tracks are produced by Mannie Fresh

Charts

References

2003 albums
Hot Boys albums
Albums produced by Mannie Fresh
Cash Money Records albums